The Andijan Dam is a buttress dam on the river Kara Darya near Andijan in Andijan Region, Uzbekistan. The dam serves several purposes to include irrigation in the Fergana Valley and hydroelectric power production. Water released from the dam can enter a canal on either side of the river downstream. The dam has two power stations located at its base, Andijan 1 and Andijan 2. The former contains four 35 MW turbine-generators and the latter contains two 25 MW Francis turbine-generators for a total installed capacity of 190 MW. Construction on the dam began in 1969 and the generators in Andijan 1 were commissioned between 1974 and 1984. Construction on Andijan 2 began in 2007 and it was commissioned on 2 September 2010. It cost US$28.5 million of which US$15.93 million was supplied by the Exim Bank of China.

The artificial lake created by this dam is the Andijan Reservoir (also: Kampyrravat Reservoir or Karadarya Reservoir). It is fed by the Kara Darya and its tributaries Kurshab and Jazy.

References

Dams in Uzbekistan
Buttress dams
Dams completed in 1984
Dams in the Aral Sea basin
Hydroelectric power stations built in the Soviet Union
Hydroelectric power stations in Uzbekistan
Andijan Region
Osh Region
Energy infrastructure completed in 1984
Energy infrastructure completed in 2010